Tales Out of Time is an album by Peter Brötzmann, Joe McPhee, Kent Kessler and Michael Zerang recorded in 2002 and released on the Swiss HatHut label in 2004.

Reception

Allmusic reviewer Thom Jurek states "This is a fiery and yet accessible date that showcases many aspects of the two men not only as players, but as composers as well". On All About Jazz Mark Corroto wrote "Quite patient in its approach, the quartet renders an amazing recording of music that announces this trip to the country". In JazzTimes Chris Kelsey noted "There's not a lot of no-holds-barred free blowing, most tracks leave plenty of sonic headroom and the playing is uniformly excellent. Ultimately, however, it's the textural and dynamic contrasts from tune to tune that are the record's greatest strength".

Track listing 
All compositions by Joe McPhee except as indicated
 "Stone Poem No. 1" - 3:15
 "Something There Is That Doesn't Love" - 6:01
 "Master of a Small House" (Peter Brötzmann) - 7:22 		
 "Cymbalism" (Michael Zerang) - 5:54
 "Alto Lightning in a Violin Sky" - 5:53
 "From Now Till Doomsday" (Brötzmann) - 6:46
 "Do You Still Love Me/Did I Ever?" (Brötzmann) - 12:07
 "In Anticipation of the Next" - 6:09
 "Blessed Assurance" (Traditional) - 4:11
 "Pieces of Red, Green and Blue" - 8:01
 "Stone Poem No. 2" - 2:24

Personnel 
Peter Brötzmann - alto saxophone, tenor saxophone
Joe McPhee - tenor saxophone, pocket cornet, trumpet
Kent Kessler - bass
Michael Zerang - drums, percussion

References 

Peter Brötzmann albums
Joe McPhee albums
2004 albums
Hathut Records albums